Ekspress-A3 ( meaning Express-A3), also designated Ekspress-3A, is a Russian communications satellite which is operated by Russian Satellite Communications Company (RSCC) and EUTELSAT.

Satellite description 
It was constructed by NPO Prikladnoi Mekhaniki (ISS Reshetnev) and Alcatel Space and is based on the MSS-2500-GSO satellite bus. It is equipped with seventeen transponders.

Launch 
The satellite was launched at Baikonur Cosmodrome Site 200 on 24 June 2000, at 00:28:00 UTC. The launch was made by Khrunichev State Research and Production Space Center, and a Proton-K / DM-2M launch vehicle was used.

Mission 
It is part of the Ekspress satellite constellation. Following its launch and on-orbit testing, it was placed in geostationary orbit at 11° West, from where it provides communications services to Russia, Europe, the Middle East and North Africa.

References

External links

Ekspress satellites
Spacecraft launched in 2000
Satellites using the KAUR bus